is a Japanese singer and voice actress.

Filmography

Video games

Discography

Studio albums

Singles

In Idol Defence Force Hummingbird

1993: Hummingbird FIRST FLIGHT [TYCY-5311]
1993: ハミングバード　太陽と裸 [TYCY-5316]
1993: 熱狂の"裸・Eve" Summer Aviation Tour '93 [TYCY-5337]
1994: ハミングバード '94夏 トラ・トラ・トラ！ [TYCY-5391]
1994: ハミングバード外伝"ザッツ・ミュージカル"卯月の反乱～こんな日が来るなんて [TYCY-5398]
1995: ハミングバードザッピングＣＤ - Vols. 1-5 [TYCY-5418 - TYCY-5422]
1995: ハミングバード 山虎 '95風の唄＆夢の場所へ [TYCY-5441]
1995: さよならハミングバード [TYCY-5450]
1995: Hummingbird GRAND FINALE at SHIBUYA-Kokaido [TYCY-5462/3]
1995: Hummingbird SISTERS [TYCY-5471]

References

External links
 
 

1969 births
Living people
Japanese voice actresses